J. P. McCaskey High School is a public high school located in Lancaster, Pennsylvania, United States. Located on the east side of Lancaster, it is named after John Piersol McCaskey, a local educator. The McCaskey campus consists of two buildings: J. P. McCaskey, which is usually referred to either as "JPM" or simply "JP"; and McCaskey East, which is referred to as "East". Also on the McCaskey campus are a number of playing fields (for soccer, baseball, softball, and field hockey), tennis courts, and a stadium. Nearby are Wickersham Elementary School and Lincoln Middle School.

History
John Piersol McCaskey High School opened on 3 May 1938, accepting Lancaster city's first gender-integrated class of students.  The high school was named for John McCaskey, a local educator, composer, and politician.

The construction is a product of the post-Depression Works Progress Administration.  While the main building was subsequently extended, the original façade, lobby, and auditorium are set in Art Deco style.       
In 2021, The outside of the JP McCaskey Building was used in an episode the Disney Channel TV show Bunk'd.

Notable alumni
 Madeline Anderson (1945), filmmaker, first African-American woman to direct a documentary film, first African-American woman to executive produce a nationally distributed television show.
Barney Ewell, sprinter, 1948 Summer Olympics silver medalist 
 Jennifer Gareis (1988), actress
 David Greene, 1994, NPR Morning Edition Host
 Jerry Johnson, professional basketball player
 Mindy Myers, campaign manager
John Parrish, former MLB pitcher 
Lamar Patterson, National Basketball Association (NBA) player and second round draft pick
Franklin J. Schaffner (valedictorian Class of 1938), film director (Planet of the Apes, Patton, Nicholas and Alexandra)
Matt Watson, former MLB outfielder 
Kris Wilson, former NFL tight end

References

External links
 

Public high schools in Pennsylvania
Education in Lancaster, Pennsylvania
Educational institutions established in 1938
Schools in Lancaster County, Pennsylvania
1938 establishments in Pennsylvania